Héronchelles is a commune in the Seine-Maritime department in the Normandy region in northern France.

Geography

Population

Places of interest
 The church of St. Geneviève and St. Nicolas, dating from the seventeenth century.
 Ruins of a feudal castle.
 A sixteenth-century chateau.
 A dovecote.
 A manor.

Leisure facilities
 A large picnic area.
 A playground.
 Petanque.
 A village hall.

See also
Communes of the Seine-Maritime department

References

External links

Official Heronchelles's Website 

Communes of Seine-Maritime